Moorestown Township, New Jersey was incorporated on March 11, 1922. The municipal government operates within the Faulkner Act (formally known as the Optional Municipal Charter Law) under Council-Manager plan E, which was implemented as of January 1, 1967, based on the recommendations of a Charter Study Commission. A five-member Council is elected at-large on a partisan basis, with each member serving a four-year term of office on a staggered basis, with either two or three seats coming up for election in even years. At a reorganization meeting held in January after each election, the council selects a mayor and a deputy mayor from among its members.

Mayors

References

 

Moorestown